The Orbison illusion (or Orbison's illusion) is an optical illusion first described by American psychologist William Orbison (1912–1952) in 1939.

The illusion consists of a two dimensional figure, such as a circle or square, superimposed over a background of radial lines or concentric circles. The result is an optical illusion in which both the figure and the rectangle which contains it appear distorted; in particular, squares appear slightly bulged, circles appear elliptical, and the containing rectangle appears tilted.

References

Optical illusions